Gamma Sculptoris, Latinized from γ Sculptoris, is a single, orange-hued star in the constellation Sculptor. Based upon an annual parallax shift of 17.90 mas as seen from Earth, this star is located about 182 light years from the Sun. It is bright enough to be visible to the naked eye with an apparent visual magnitude of 4.41. It is moving away from the Sun with a radial velocity of +15.6 km/s.

This is an evolved K-type giant star with a stellar classification of K1 III. At the age of 2.47 billion years it is a red clump star on the horizontal branch, which means it is generating energy through helium fusion at its core. The star has 1.60 times the mass of the Sun and it has expanded to 12 times the Sun's radius. It is radiating 72 times the Sun's luminosity from its enlarged photosphere at an effective temperature of 4,578 K

References

K-type giants
Horizontal-branch stars
Sculptor (constellation)
Sculptoris, Gamma
CD-33 16476
9821
219784
115102
8863